Bucculatrix divisa is a moth in the family Bucculatricidae. It is found in North America, where it has been recorded from Utah and Washington. It was first described in 1925 by Annette Frances Braun.

The wingspan is about 8–9 mm. The forewings are whitish, shaded with a varying amount of pale ashy grey, brownish ocherous or brown, and suffused with dark brown. The hindwings vary from pale silvery grey to blackish fuscous.

The larvae feed on Balsamorhiza sagittata. They mine the leaves of their host plant. The mine starts as a translucent gallery, later enlarging into a small irregular blotch. The frass is deposited in the mine. Older larvae leave the mine and feed on the lower surface of the leaf, mining into the leaf, but with only their head and thorax in the mine. Pupation takes place in a whitish to pinkish cocoon, which is spun on the underside of the leaf.

References

Natural History Museum Lepidoptera generic names catalog

Bucculatricidae
Moths described in 1925
Moths of North America
Taxa named by Annette Frances Braun